Offensen is a railway station located just outside Offensen, a district of the town of Uslar in the Northeim area, Lower Saxony, Germany. The station is located on the Oberweserbahn and the train services are operated by NordWestBahn.

Train services
The station is served by the following services:

Local services  Ottbergen – Bad Karlshafen – Bodenfelde – Göttingen

References

External links
 

Railway stations in Lower Saxony